Load or LOAD may refer to:

Aeronautics and transportation
Load factor (aeronautics), the ratio of the lift of an aircraft to its weight
Passenger load factor, the ratio of revenue passenger miles to available seat miles of a particular transportation operation (e.g. a flight)

Biology and medicine
Afterload, the maximum effect of a heartbeat driving blood mass out of the heart into the aorta and pulmonary arteries
Genetic load, of a population
Late-Onset Alzheimer's disease (acronym: LOAD), a chronic neurodegenerative disease
Parasite load, of an organism
Viral load, of organisms and populations

Computing and electricity
Load (computing), a measure of how much processing a computer performs
Electrical load, a device connected to the output of a circuit
Electronic load, a simulated electrical load used for testing purposes
Invade-a-Load, was a fast loader routine used in software for the Commodore 64 computer; it was used in commercial computer games
Load balancing (computing), or load distribution, a method that improves the distribution of workloads across multiple computing resources
Load balancing (electrical power), or load distribution, the storing of excess electrical power by power stations during low demand periods, for release as demand rises
Load cell, a transducer that is used to create an electrical signal
Load factor (computer science), the ratio of the number of records to the number of addresses within a data structure
Load factor (electrical), the average power divided by the peak power over a period of time
Load file, the file used to import data into a database or to link images
Load management, also known as demand side management (DSM),  the process of balancing the supply of electricity on the network with the electrical load
Load testing, the process of putting demand on a system and measuring its response

Mechanics, construction, and architecture
Add-on factor, or load factor, floor area, floor space, or floorspace, is the area (measured as square feet or square metres) taken up by a building or part of it
Mechanical load, the external mechanical resistance against which a machine, such as a motor or engine, acts
Structural load, forces which apply to a structure 
Wind load
Moving load, this is the load that changes in time the place to which is applied

Music
Load Records, an American experimental independent record label
Load (album), the 6th album released by the band Metallica
Loads (album), a 1995 compilation of the British pop group Happy Mondays

Places
Load, Kentucky
Load Brook, a hamlet in England

Other uses
The Load, a 2018 Serbian war film
Cargo, paraphernalia being transported
Factor loadings, in statistics, the exposure to specific factors or components in Factor Analysis or Principal Component Analysis
Load fund, a mutual fund with a type of commission known as load
Load, a sexual slang term for Semen

See also
Loaded (disambiguation)
Loader (disambiguation)
Loading (disambiguation)
Lod
Lode
Preload (disambiguation)